Barr Britvic Soft Drinks plc was a proposed company to be founded by the merger between two British soft drink manufacturers, A.G. Barr and Britvic. Former Britvic shareholders were to own 63 per cent of the combined entity, whilst Barr shareholders would have held 37 per cent. Measured by revenue, it would have been one of the largest soft drinks companies in Europe. The company would have had annual sales of more than £1.5 billion and would have employed around 4,300 staff.

The company would have produced such well known brands as Robinsons, Irn-Bru and Tango. In the UK and Ireland it would have held the license to produce Pepsi and 7UP under license from PepsiCo.

Its legal headquarters were to be at AG Barr’s existing head office in Cumbernauld, Scotland, while the operational headquarters would have been in Hemel Hempstead in southern England, where Britvic is based.

Whilst The Economist described the merger as "a defensive alliance", Russell Lynch of The Independent said, "The tie-up will help AG Barr’s push into the south, with its strength among smaller shopkeepers dovetailing with Britvic’s pub trade presence."

The proposed merger was abandoned in July 2013, after the two companies failed to agree upon terms.

References

Drink companies of the United Kingdom
Soft drinks manufacturers